Ptilotrichum is a genus of flowering plants belonging to the family Brassicaceae.

Its native range is Southern Siberia to Western Himalaya.

Species:
 Ptilotrichum canescens (DC.) C.A.Mey.

References

Brassicaceae
Brassicaceae genera